Amaq News Agency is a news outlet linked to the Islamic State (IS). Amaq is often the "first point of publication for claims of responsibility" for terrorist attacks in Western countries by the Islamic State. In March 2019, Amaq News Agency was designated as a Foreign Terrorist Organization by the US Department of State.

History 
Among the founders of Amaq was Syrian journalist Baraa Kadek, who joined IS in late 2013, and seven others who originally worked for Halab News Network. According to The New York Times, it has a direct connection with IS, from which it "gets tips". Its name was taken from Amik Valley in Hatay Province, which is mentioned in a hadith as the site of an "apocalyptic victory over non-believers".

Amaq News Agency was first noticed by SITE during the Siege of Kobanî (Syria) in 2014, when its updates were shared among IS fighters. It became more widely known after it began reporting claims of responsibility for terrorist attacks in Western countries, such as the 2015 San Bernardino attack, for which IS officially claimed responsibility the next day. An Amaq cameraman shot the first footage of the capture of Palmyra in 2015.

Amaq launched an official mobile app in 2015 and has warned against unofficial versions that reportedly have been used to spy on its users. It also uses a Telegram account. It had a WordPress-based blog, but it was removed without explanation in April 2016.

On 31 May 2017, a Facebook post announced Amaq's founder, Baraa Kadek AKA Rayan Meshaal, had been killed with his daughter by an American airstrike on Mayadin. The post was reportedly made by his younger brother. Reuters could not immediately verify this account. On 27 July 2017, the US confirmed that Kadek had been killed by a coalition airstrike near Mayadin between 25 and 27 May 2017.

In June 2017, German police arrested a 23-year-old Syrian man identified only as Mohammed G., accusing him of communicating with the alleged perpetrator of the 2016 Malmö Muslim community centre arson in order to report to Amaq.

On 21 March 2019, the U.S. Department of State officially deemed Amaq an alias of IS, and thus a Foreign Terrorist Organization.

Character 
Amaq publishes a stream of short news reports, both text and video, on the mobile app Telegram. The reports take on the trappings of mainstream journalism, with "Breaking News" headings, and embedded reporters at the scenes of ISIL battles. The reports try to appear neutral, toning down the jihadist language and sectarian slurs IS uses in its official releases.

Charlie Winter of the Transcultural Conflict and Violence Initiative at Georgia State University, and Rita Katz of SITE Intelligence Group in Washington say Amaq functions much like the state-owned news agency of IS, though the group does not acknowledge it as such. Katz said it behaves "like a state media". Amaq appears to have been allowed to develop by IS as a way to have a news outlet that is controlled by the group but is somewhat removed from it, giving IS more of the appearance of legitimacy.

Reliability 

According to Rukmini Callimachi in The New York Times: "Despite a widespread view that the Islamic State opportunistically claims attacks with which it has little genuine connection, its track record—minus a handful of exceptions—suggests a more rigorous protocol. At times, the Islamic State has gotten details wrong, or inflated casualty figures, but the gist of its claims is typically correct." According to Callimachi, the group considers itself responsible for acts carried out by people who were inspired by its propaganda, as well as acts carried out by its own personnel and in some instances, had claimed attacks before the identities of the killers were known.

Graeme Wood writing in The Atlantic in October 2017, wrote "The idea that the Islamic State simply scans the news in search of mass killings, then sends out press releases in hope of stealing glory, is false. Amaq may learn details of the attacks from mainstream media … but its claim of credit typically flows from an Amaq-specific source."

An October 2017 article in The Hill, points to two false claims made in the summer of 2017, the Resorts World Manila attack and a false claim that bombs had been planted at Charles de Gaulle Airport in Paris. Also, a claimed IS connection to the 2017 Las Vegas shooting proved to be false.
	
According to Rita Katz on the SITE Intelligence Group website, calling a terrorist a "soldier of the caliphate (warrior from the caliphate)" in a statement issued by Amaq, was the usual way in which IS indicated that it inspired an attack. Centrally coordinated attacks were usually described as "executed by a detachment belonging to the Islamic State", and were often announced by both Amaq and by IS' central media command.

Online presence 
In November 2019, Belgian police claimed to have carried out a successful cyberattack on Amaq's on-line presence, thus leaving ISIL without an operational communication channel.

References 

2014 establishments in Syria
Arabic-language mass media
Arabic-language websites
Islamic State of Iraq and the Levant mass media
Mobile applications
Publications established in 2014
Syrian news websites
Internet properties established in 2014